The Niagara Escarpment AVA is an American Viticultural Area in Niagara County, New York along the Niagara Escarpment.

This wine region is less developed with more open spaces than the 70 or so Niagara Peninsula wineries on the Canadian side of the Niagara River, but shares the same terroir.  Wines range from traditional grape varieties such as Merlot, Cabernet Franc, Cabernet Sauvignon. Chardonnay and Riesling to fruit wines. The hardiness zones are 6a and 6b.

History
The oldest winery in the region dates to the 19th century (no longer in business), but the region's growth began in the late 1990s with the opening of the first new winery. There are now 22 wineries making up the Niagara Wine Trail.

References

External links
 Niagara Wine Trail web site

American Viticultural Areas
New York (state) wine
Niagara Escarpment
Niagara County, New York
2005 establishments in New York (state)